The atlas pebblesnail (Somatogyrus humerosus) is a species of minute freshwater snail that has an operculum, an aquatic operculate gastropod mollusk in the family Hydrobiidae. This species is endemic to the United States.  Its natural habitat is rivers.

References

Somatogyrus
Gastropods described in 1906
Taxonomy articles created by Polbot